A Crop Mob is a group of volunteers who incidentally get together to carry out a set of agricultural tasks as requested by the owner or manager of the plot where the group assembles. A defining characteristic is that farmers and gardeners work in large groups.

History 
The term crop mob was coined in or before 2008 by volunteer farmhands working on a biofarm in the Research Triangle area of North Carolina. The first so-called crop mob took place in October 2008 with 19 volunteers. A website and social media were set up. Before 2010, 15 crop mobs were organized. The idea took off and crop mobs were organized in at least 70 other places.

Examples of organized crop mobs 

 Atlanta, GA
 Pennsylvania, organized by the Sustainability Institute at Penn State University
 Vermont, organized by the Center for Sustainable Agriculture of the University of Vermont
 Michigan, organized by the Michigan Young Farmer Coalition

Interpretation 
Crop Mob has been described as "a modern, Internet-connected take on the agrarian culture that faded with the industrialization of farming. In a tough market, crop mobs can give small farms a shot in the arm and connect them to potential customers."

By comparison, the total number of farms of all sizes statewide dropped two percent during the same period, McReynolds says. The help of groups of volunteers can be important for small farms.

Another guiding idea is that crop mobs help young people to learn from experienced farmers about agriculture and sustainable farming.

References

External links
 Link to Official Website

History of agriculture in the United States